Tommy Pearce Bowden (born July 10, 1954) is a former American football coach. He served as the head coach at Clemson University from 1999 until October 13, 2008. He is a son of Bobby Bowden, former head football coach of Florida State University, against whom he coached in games nicknamed the "Bowden Bowl." He is also a brother of Terry Bowden, who served as the head coach of Auburn.

Coaching career
Before coming to Clemson, Bowden was the head coach at Tulane University, and an assistant at the University of Alabama, Auburn University, Duke University, the University of Kentucky, East Carolina University and, with his father, at Florida State. His 1998 Tulane squad went 12–0 and achieved a top-10 final ranking in both polls.  Despite being one of only two undefeated teams in the regular season, Tulane was not even considered for a bid in a Bowl Championship Series game because it was believed they had not played a difficult schedule.

Bowden was hired as Clemson's head coach before the 1999 season.  Bowden's Clemson teams went to a bowl game every year he coached there, except in 2004, when, after a brawl with rival South Carolina, both teams withdrew from bowl consideration for that season.  He resigned on October 13, 2008, after leading the team to a disappointing 3–3 record (1–2 ACC) at the midpoint of a season in which the Tigers had been an almost unanimous preseason pick to win their first ACC title under Bowden and were ranked #9 in the preseason polls. Assistant head coach/wide receivers coach Dabo Swinney was named as interim head coach for the remainder of the season. In ten seasons, Bowden led the Tigers to zero conference championships, finishing only as high as second in the conference twice and second in the Atlantic division three times.

Personal

Bowden attended and played football for West Virginia University from 1972 through 1976.  He is married to Linda White and has two children, Ryan and Lauren. He is a son of former Florida State Seminoles head coach, the late Bobby Bowden and has two sisters and three brothers, including Terry, former head coach at Auburn University , and Jeff, who served as an assistant coach on his brother Terry's staff. Bowden is an evangelical Christian. He has openly used his religion as a recruiting tool, saying that his faith “was a tremendous recruiting advantage.”

Head coaching record

*Self-imposed punishment for team fight with South Carolina
‡ Bowden resigned on October 13, 2008.

References

1954 births
Living people
Auburn Tigers football coaches
Clemson Tigers football coaches
Duke Blue Devils football coaches
East Carolina Pirates football coaches
Florida State Seminoles football coaches
Kentucky Wildcats football coaches
Tulane Green Wave football coaches
West Virginia Mountaineers football players
Morgantown High School alumni
Players of American football from Birmingham, Alabama
Sportspeople from Birmingham, Alabama
Sportspeople from Morgantown, West Virginia
Coaches of American football from West Virginia
Players of American football from West Virginia